Tammy Nuccio is an American Politician currently serving as a Connecticut state Representative from the 53rd District, which encompasses the towns of Ashford and Willington as well as part of Tolland. A member of the Republican Party, Nuccio was first elected to the seat in 2020 after defeating Democratic Incumbent Pat Wilson Pheanious.  In January 2021, Nuccio proposed an amendment to the state constitution that would prevent revenue collected from transportation-related taxes from being diverted to other programs, citing the fact that the Connecticut state transportation fund is set to be depleted by 2024. She serves as a member of the House Finance, Revenue and Bonding Committee, the Insurance and Real Estate Committee, and the Commerce Committee.

References

Year of birth missing (living people)
Living people
People from Tolland, Connecticut
Republican Party members of the Connecticut House of Representatives
Women state legislators in Connecticut
21st-century American women